Sita Divari,  is a former Thai Air Force officer and politician. He is a former spokesperson for the Prime Minister's Office in the government of Prime Minister Thaksin Shinawatra.

Early life and education
Sita Divari was born on 6 November 1964, He was the son of Manop Divari and Mom Rajawongse Jaruwan Vorawan who was the granddaughter of Prince Dulpakorn Worawan, son of Prince Narathip Praphanphong. He completed primary and secondary education at Saint Dominic School, Upper Secondary from Triam Udom Suksa School and then Armed Forces Academies Preparatory School, Class 24 as the president of the class and a bachelor's degree in science from the Royal Thai Air Force Academy.

Air career 
After graduating, he served in the Air Force and became an Northrop F-5 fighter pilot and climbed to the ranks of an F-16 fighter pilot for about 8 years. until receiving the last position before resigning from government service is the deputy head of the joint planning department, Policy and Planning Division, Department of Operations, Royal Thai Air Force.

He was head of the Airports of Thailand board of directors (2013–2014).

Political career 
Then resigned from government service to apply for elections as members of the House of Representatives. under the Thai Rak Thai Party and was appointed as a spokesperson for the Prime Minister's Office and also Deputy Secretary-General to the Prime Minister for Political Affairs under the government of Prime Minister Thaksin Shinawatra.

Subsequently, in 2007, he was disqualified from politics for 5 years because he was a member of the executive committee of the Thai Rak Thai Party, which was dissolved in the 2006 political party dissolution case. Later he joined the Pheu Thai Party and served as the coordinator of the Pheu Thai Party Election Strategy Committee later resigned from the Pheu Thai Party and joined the Thai Sang Thai Party.

He is the Thai Sang Thai Party candidate in the 2022 Bangkok gubernatorial election.but not elected

Royal decorations 
2003 -  Knight Grand Cross (First Class) Order of the White Elephant.
2002 -   Knight Grand Cross (First Class) Order of the Crown of Thailand.

References 

Living people
1964 births
Sita Tiwaree
Sita Tiwaree
Sita Tiwaree